Nader Al-Muwallad (born 23 July 1992) is a Saudi professional footballer who plays as a midfielder for Al-Diriyah.

References

External links 
 

1992 births
Living people
Saudi Arabian footballers
Ohod Club players
Al-Shabab FC (Riyadh) players
Al-Raed FC players
Al-Faisaly FC players
Al-Orobah FC players
Al-Adalah FC players
Al-Diriyah Club players
Saudi Professional League players
Saudi First Division League players
Saudi Second Division players
Association football midfielders